Qeshlaq-e Khurasha may refer to:
 Qeshlaq-e Khurasha-ye Olya
 Qeshlaq-e Khurasha-ye Sofla